Bachtel Tower (German: Bachtelturm) is a  tall radio tower on  high Bachtel mountain near Hinwil, Switzerland, overlooking the Zürcher Oberland. 
Bachtel Tower is a lattice tower whose observation deck,  metres above the ground, is accessible by a stairway. It was built as replacement for a smaller observation tower on the site in 1986. On the observation deck of Bachtel Tower there is an illustration with the names of the mountains of the Swiss Alps visible. This illustration was designed by Paul Thalmann from Wernetshausen near Hinwil.

History 
In 1873, a wooden tower was built; it was destroyed twenty years later, followed in 1893 by an observation tower of steel. This second tower was declared in 1979 by the government of the canton of Zürich as an object of historic preservation. Six years later, the tower was stored by the Swiss Post (former PTT) on technical reasons, and in 1992, the tower was rebuilt on Pfannenstiel.

Gallery

See also 
 List of towers

External links 

 Bachtel Tower on swisspanoramas.ch

Towers completed in 1986
Observation towers in Switzerland
20th-century architecture in Switzerland